Ceratostoma foliatum is a species of medium to large sea snail, a marine gastropod mollusk in the family Muricidae, the rock snails.

Distribution
This species lives in the Eastern Pacific.
Known from California, West coast of North America.

References

Muricidae
Gastropods described in 1791
Taxa named by Johann Friedrich Gmelin